Azteca chartifex is a species of ant in the genus Azteca. Described by Forel in 1896, the species is endemic to various countries in North America and South America.

References

Azteca (genus)
Hymenoptera of North America
Hymenoptera of South America
Insects described in 1896
Articles containing video clips